Miami Carol City Senior High School (MCCSH) is a public high school located at 3301 Miami Gardens Drive
in Miami Gardens, Florida, United States. It was established in 1963.  The school is part of the Miami-Dade County Public Schools system. The school serves students from the area of Miami Gardens, a community south of Ft. Lauderdale, Florida, north of downtown Miami, Florida and home to the Miami Dolphins, in what is currently known as Hard Rock Stadium.

History
The school opened in an unincorporated area of Miami-Dade County in 1963. At the time, farms were in the surrounding area. Several years later integration busing brought African Americans from areas such as Bunche Park to Carol City.  The school was racially integrated in 1967.

In 1986, ten faculty members, including three teachers, were found to have engaged in crimes; each person was found to have committed recreational drug use or property theft.

The school was formerly located within the census-designated place of Carol City. Miami Gardens incorporated as a city on May 13, 2003.

Garcia said that, in 2006, "a familial closeness still defined the school. And Carol City High students — until they graduated or dropped out, at least — seemed safe from the violence that had gripped the surrounding area." In spring 2006, three students from the class of 2006 were murdered; none of them were members of gangs, nor were they involved in the recreational drug trade. After Miami Carol City held its graduation ceremony, three graduates were killed. People in the Miami area referred to the class as the "cursed class of 2006." Garcia said "If there is a curse, it seems it has a much wider breadth than one class" and "Carol City bloodshed has only gained speed" after the class of 2006 graduated, since students from subsequent classes died in violent crimes. On a Tuesday in November 2007, a robber shot a teacher, who had been smoking a cigarette outside of the campus building. The 18-year-old robber stole the teacher's wallet and was later arrested. The teacher survived the shooting. On February 11, 2008, 43-year-old 11th grade algebra teacher, Sergio Miranda, was shot by 19-year-old Patrick Lively, outside of the School during a robbery but survived. In 2011, Lively received a life sentence. In November 2014, Two teens were shot during a fight at Miami Carol City High School. One of the boys died.

Demographics
Miami Carol City is 86% black, 13% Hispanic, and 1% white non-Hispanic.

Academics
Gus Garcia-Roberts of the Miami New Times said that in the 1970s, the school was considered in the area to be a good school academically and athletically; according to Garcia, "in years before academic performance was distilled as statistic, glowing student testimonials and national contest winners told the story." Between 1974 and 1980, Miami Carol City students received four National Merit Scholarships; of them, three were National Achievement Scholarships for African-American students. Garcia said that the State of Florida "liked to herald the diverse school."

Bob Graham, former Governor of the State of Florida and former US Senator, began his "Workdays" in 1974 at Miami Carol City Senior High. It was a program where he worked eight-hour days at various jobs held by his constituents. Starting in September 1974, Graham taught a semester of civics while serving in the Florida Senate.

The school's academic reputation declined by 1981, when fewer than 70% of the students passed a basic achievement test, resulting in a "deficient" ranking for the school. The school received straight "D" rankings from 1998 to 2006.

According to the Florida Department of Education, Miami Carol City Senior High received the grade of "D" on the School Accountability Reports for the school years 2001-02, 2002–03, 2003–04 and 2004-05.

MCCHS was labeled a "dropout factory" in a Johns Hopkins University study of US Department of Education data. The study looked at the retention rates of students from their freshman to senior year. MCCHS had a retention rate of just 53%, meaning that only 53 out of every 100 students who entered the school as a freshman made it through their senior year and obtained a high school diploma.

Athletics
In the period after the school opened, according to Gus Garcia-Roberts of the Miami New Times, the top sports at Miami Carol were football, basketball and wrestling.

The marching band has been referred to as the "soul" of the school. Garcia said that it no longer "gyrates to Jefferson Airplane." After the demographic shift at the school, according to Garcia, the school still had "its fame for diligent coaching and talented kids."

American football, as of 2009, is the strongest sport at the school. The Chiefs won the Football State Championship in 1977 with a 14-0 season record. In the previous year 1976 the football team were the State Runners Up in football. The school won three American football state championships in a period between 1996 and 2003.

The Chiefs were runner ups for the state basketball championship in 1970, and won the state basketball championship in 1972.  The gymnastics team also had state champions in individual events during that period.

Center for Legal & Public Affairs Magnet Program 

Miami Carol City Senior High School offers a Law Magnet Program, which enables students to learn more about the law, courts, and business.

To enter the program, students must have a 2.5 GPA and maintain a 3.0 once they are in the program. In their 11th and 12th grade years, students can earn up to 24 college credits while in college through dual enrollment with Miami-Dade College North Campus. An internship program is also offered, in which students leave campus and get hands-on work experience.

The magnet program at the school is offered to college-bound students wishing to pursue interests in law or government.  These students work closely with professionals, participating in shadowing and mentoring programs. They take field trips to law firms, courthouses and other governmental agencies.

During the summers, students attend special-interest institutes at local colleges and universities. Faculty members work with these students on projects. Other students participate in internships working for local government, law enforcement agencies, or law offices. The Center for Legal and Public Affairs offers opportunities for qualified upper division students to attend Miami-Dade Community College in the afternoon, during 7th and 8th periods.

Admission to the Center for Legal and Public Affairs is based on each student's interest. Students should have stanines of 5 or greater, teacher recommendations, and a minimum academic grade point average of 2.5 on a 4.0 scale.

School uniforms
The school has for the most part maintained a dress code, with students being required to wear school uniforms in the last few decades.

Notable alumni

 Kantroy Barber (Class of 1991), former NFL running back
 Brisco (Class of 2002)
 Denzel Curry (Class of 2013)
 Nick Esasky (Class of 1978), baseball player with the Cincinnati Reds and Atlanta Braves
 Ricky Jean Francois (Class of 2005), former NFL defensive tackle. 
 Rashad Fenton (Class of 2015) NFL cornerback for the Kansas City Chiefs and the Atlanta Falcons. 
 Flo Rida (Class of 1998)
 Rannell Hall, NFL wide receiver with the Cleveland Browns
 Aubrey Hill (Class of 1990), college football player and coach.
 Allen Hurns, NFL wide receiver with the Miami Dolphins
 Miguel Machado (Class of 2011), Michigan State University football player
 Trayvon Martin, killed in Sanford, Florida -  attended for 9th grade and much of the 10th grade, transferred to Krop High School)
 Santana Moss (Class of 1997)
 Sinorice Moss (Class of 2002)
 Gordon Murray, (Class of 1978), Judge, Eleventh Judicial Circuit Court
 Fred Nixon
 Jo Marie Payton (Class of 1968), actress who played Harriett Winslow in Family Matters 
 Kenny Phillips (Class of 2005)
 Ken Pruitt, Florida State Senate President 2006-2008 (Class of 1975)
 William Roberts (Class of 1980), football player for New York Giants, New York Jets and New England Patriots; two-time Super Bowl Champion with the Giants
 Rick Ross (Class of 1994)
 Robert Sands (Class of 2008)
 John Swain (Class of 1977)
 Danny Tartabull (Class of 1980)
 Lester Williams (Class of 1978)
 Eugene Wilde, Recording Artist who had two #1 R&B Hits in 1984-85

References

External links 

 
 GreatSchools.net profile
 Miami-Dade County public schools

Miami-Dade County Public Schools high schools
Educational institutions established in 1963
Miami Gardens, Florida
1963 establishments in Florida